The 2022 Copa Libertadores Final was the final match which decided the winner of the 2022 Copa Libertadores. This was the 63rd edition of the Copa Libertadores, the top-tier South American continental club football tournament organized by CONMEBOL.

The match was played on 29 October 2022 at the Estadio Monumental in Guayaquil, Ecuador, between Brazilian sides Flamengo and Athletico Paranaense.

Flamengo defeated Athletico Paranaense by a 1–0 score to win their third title in the tournament. As winners of the 2022 Copa Libertadores, they qualified for the 2022 FIFA Club World Cup and earned the right to play against the winners of the 2022 Copa Sudamericana in the 2023 Recopa Sudamericana. They also automatically qualified for the 2023 Copa Libertadores group stage.

Venue

Teams

Road to the final

Note: In all scores below, the score of the home team is given first.

Match

Summary
Guillermo Varela, Rodrigo Caio, Bruno Henrique (Flamengo), Julimar, Reinaldo and Marcelo Cirino (Athletico Paranaense) were ruled out of the final due to injuries.
Gabriel Barbosa got the only goal of the game in added time in the first half when he side-footed in a low cross from the right at the far post.

Details

See also 

 2022 Copa Sudamericana Final
 2023 Recopa Sudamericana

References

External links 
 CONMEBOL.com

2022
Final
2022 in South American football
International club association football competitions hosted by Ecuador
Copa Libertadores Final 2022
Copa Libertadores Final 2022